Alwine may refer to:
 1169 Alwine, asteroid
 Alwine (Uebigau-Wahrenbrück), settlement near Leipzig, Germany